Laze v Tuhinju is a village in the Tuhinj Valley in the Municipality of Kamnik in the Upper Carniola region of Slovenia.

Name
The name of the settlement was changed from Laze to Laze v Tuhinju in 1955. In the past the German name was Laase.

Gallery

References

External links

Laze v Tuhinju on Geopedia

Populated places in the Municipality of Kamnik